Augustus Leonard Perrill (January 20, 1807 – June 2, 1882) was an American educator and law enforcement officer who served as a U.S. Representative from Ohio for one term from 1845 to 1847.

Early life and career 
Born near Moorefield, Virginia (now West Virginia), Perrill moved to Ohio with his parents in 1816, who settled in Madison Township near Lithopolis, Ohio.  He attended the local schools, and then taught school near Circleville, Ohio, and then engaged in agricultural pursuits.  He was appointed deputy sheriff in January 1833.

Perrill was elected sheriff in 1834 and served until 1837. He served as a member of the Ohio House of Representatives 1839-1841.

Congress 
Perrill was elected as a Democrat to the Twenty-ninth Congress (March 4, 1845 – March 3, 1847).  He was an unsuccessful candidate for reelection in 1846 to the Thirtieth Congress.

Later career 
He resumed agricultural pursuits near Circleville. He served as a member of the Ohio Senate 1858-1863.  He again served in the Ohio House of Representatives 1865-1867.

Death
He died on his farm near Circleville June 2, 1882.  He was interred in Forest Cemetery in Circleville.

References

1807 births
1882 deaths
People from Moorefield, West Virginia
People from Pickaway County, Ohio
Democratic Party Ohio state senators
Democratic Party members of the Ohio House of Representatives
American deputy sheriffs
Ohio sheriffs
Farmers from Ohio
19th-century American politicians
People from Circleville, Ohio
Democratic Party members of the United States House of Representatives from Ohio